In Innu mythology, Matshishkapeu ("The Farting God") is the most powerful spirit and is even more powerful than the Caribou Master. He proved himself when the Caribou Master refused to give the Innu any caribou to eat. Matshishkapeu was so angry that he cursed the Caribou Master with a painful case of constipation. Finally, the Caribou Master relented, and Matshishkapeu then cured him of his ailment.

References

 B. C. Goddard, "Rangifer and Man: An ancient relationship", in Proc. Ninth Workshop North American Caribou, edd. S. Coutourier and Q. van Ginhoven, Kuujjuac, Quebec, 2003.  Rangifer special volume 14, pp. 15–28

Deities and spirits
Flatulence in popular culture
Innu culture
Algonquian mythology